R. William Patterson (July 28, 1908 – June 18, 1994), a U.S. politician and member of the Democratic party, was mayor of Dayton, Ohio, from 1958 to 1962.

An accomplished attorney before entering politics, Patterson followed his tenure as mayor with an unsuccessful bid to unseat Republican incumbent Paul F. Schenck as member of the United States House of Representatives. 
 
Patterson married Virginia Karns and they had three children: Ann, James, and Ryan. He is buried with his wife at Calvary Cemetery in Dayton.

See also
 Mayors of Dayton, Ohio
 Election Results, U.S. Representative from Ohio, 3rd District

1908 births
1994 deaths
Ohio Democrats
Mayors of Dayton, Ohio
20th-century American politicians